Sola de Vega District is located in the Sierra Sur Region of the State of Oaxaca, Mexico.
The district center is Villa Sola de Vega.

Municipalities

The district includes the following municipalities:
 
San Francisco Cahuacúa
San Francisco Sola
San Ildefonso Sola
San Jacinto Tlacotepec
San Lorenzo Texmelucan
San Vicente Lachixío
Santa Cruz Zenzontepec
Santa María Lachixío
Santa María Sola
Santa María Zaniza
Santiago Amoltepec
Santiago Minas
Santiago Textitlán
Santo Domingo Teojomulco
Villa Sola de Vega
Zapotitlán del Río

References

Districts of Oaxaca
Sierra Sur de Oaxaca